Bamba Bakary  is an Ivorian actor, comedian and television presenter from the Ivory Coast.

Formerly an air steward for Air Afrique, Bakary became an ambassador for the prevention of AIDS for Africans, including in his role as Moussa, in Moussa le taximan. He is also the presenter of three shows on La Première (RTI) : Tonnerre which is shown regularly, Le bon vieux temps and Bonne cuisine.

Filmography
 1988 : Dancing in the Dust, by Henri Duparc 
 1990 : Le Sixième Doigt, by Henri Duparc
 2008- : Coup de force
 2008- : Dr Boris

References

20th-century Ivorian male actors
Male comedians
Living people
Year of birth missing (living people)
21st-century Ivorian male actors